Coty Sensabaugh (born November 15, 1988) is a former American football cornerback. He played college football at Clemson and was drafted by the Tennessee Titans in the fourth round of the 2012 NFL Draft.

College career
He played college football at Clemson University.

Professional career
Coming out of Clemson, Sensabaugh received an invitation to the annual NFL Combine in Indianapolis. He attended the combine, completed all of the required combine drills, and finished third among all defensive backs in the 40-yard dash. On March 8, 2012, he opted to participate at Clemson's pro day, along with Brandon Thompson, Dwayne Allen, Andre Branch, Antoine McClain, Kourtnei Brown, and others. Sensabaugh chose to stand on his combine numbers and only perform positional drills for the team representatives and scouts in attendance. After his pre-draft process was complete, he received a sixth round draft projection from NFL draft experts and analysts. He was ranked the 26th best cornerback prospect in the draft by NFLDraftScout.com.

Tennessee Titans
The Tennessee Titans selected Sensabaugh in the fourth round (115th overall) in the 2012 NFL Draft.

2012
On May 11, 2012, the Tennessee Titans signed Sensabaugh to a four-year, $2.5 million contract.
 
Sensabaugh entered training camp his rookie year competing with Tommie Campbell, Chris Hawkins, Ryan Mouton, and Terrence Wheatley to be the Tennessee Titans' third cornerback on their depth chart. Head coach Mike Munchak named Sensabaugh the fifth cornerback on the depth chart to begin the season, behind Jason McCourty, Alterraun Verner, Tommie Campbell, and Ryan Mouton. His defensive backs coach with the Titans was Brett Maxie, who was also his cousin Gerald's coach with the New York Jets.

He made his professional regular-season debut in the Tennessee Titans' season-opening 13–34 loss to the New England Patriots. The following week, Sensabaugh recorded two combined tackles during a 10–38 loss at the San Diego Chargers in Week 2. On November 4, 2012, Sensabaugh received his first career start and collected four combined tackle as the Titans lost to the Chicago Bears, 20–51. He finished his rookie season with a total of 31 combined tackles (22 solo) and three pass deflections in three starts and 16 games.

2013
Sensabaugh competed with Blidi Wreh-Wilson and Tommie Campbell for the Tennessee Titans' position as the third cornerback. After showing promise throughout training camp, he was named the third cornerback on the depth chart to begin the regular season. During the Titans' 16–9 season-opening victory over the Pittsburgh Steelers, Sensabaugh recorded a season-high five solo tackles and deflected a pass. The next week, he earned his first start of the season and recorded two combined tackles as the Titans lost, 24–30, to the Houston Texans.

On December 18, 2013, the Titans placed Sensabaugh on injured reserve due to a foot injury. He finished the  season with a total of 32 combined tackles (26 solo) and six pass deflections while starting three games and appearing in 14.

2014
Sensabaugh entered training camp in  competing to be the starting cornerback opposite Jason McCourty after Alterraun Verner left via free agency. He lost the job to Blidi Wreh-Wilson and was named the third corner on the depth chart ahead of Brandon Harris and Marqueston Huff.

During the Tennessee Titans' season-opening 26–10 victory over the Kansas City Chiefs, he recorded a solo tackle and made his first career sack on Chiefs' quarterback Alex Smith. The following game, he earned his first start of the season and collected four solo tackles during a 10–26 loss to the Dallas Cowboys. On September 28, 2014, Sensabaugh recorded a season-high six solo tackles and a pass deflection as the Titans lost 17–41 to the Indianapolis Colts. He suffered a knee injury and was inactive for three games (Weeks 6-8) of the season. He finished the  season with a total of 47 combined tackles (39 solo), a pass defection, and one sack in 13 games and six starts.

2015
Head coach Ken Whisenhunt held an open competition to name a new starting cornerback to start alongside Jason McCourty. The competition was between newcomer Perrish Cox, Blidi Wreh-Wilson, Jemea Thomas, and Sensabaugh. Although Perrish Cox was named the starting cornerback alongside Jason McCourty, Sensabaugh was able to win the starting nickel back job over Blidi Wreh-Wilson.

Sensabaugh started the Tennessee Titans season-opening 42–14 victory over the Tampa Bay Buccaneers and finished with a pass deflection and intercepted Jameis Winston's first career pass attempt, returning it for a 26-yard touchdown. This marked Sensabaugh's first career interception and first career touchdown. On October 18, 2015, he recorded three combined tackles and picked off Dolphin's quarterback Ryan Tannehill for his second interception of the season, as the Titans defeated the Dolphins 38–10. With the expanded playing time as a starter,  marked Sensabaugh's best year as a pro, finishing the season with a career-high 60 combined tackles (44 solo), a career-high eight pass deflections, and a career-high two interceptions in 15 starts and 16 games.

Los Angeles Rams
On March 14, 2016, the Los Angeles Rams signed him to a three-year, $15 million contract with $6.5 million guaranteed.

Sensabaugh was brought into the Rams organization to compete for the vacant starting cornerback position left by the departure of Janoris Jenkins. He competed with E. J. Gaines, Lamarcus Joyner, and Marcus Roberson for the starting position. Head coach Jeff Fisher named Sensabaugh the starting corner, opposite Trumaine Johnson to begin the regular season. He made his Los Angeles Ram's debut in their season-opening 0–28 loss at the San Francisco 49ers and accumulated a career-high nine solo tackles and forced the first fumble of his career. The following week, Sensabaugh was benched in favor of Troy Hill during a 9–3 victory over the Seattle Seahawks. With Trumaine Johnson solidified as the top cornerback, the return of E.J. Gaines, and Lamarcus Joyner playing as their starting nickel back, Sensabaugh was inactive for a Week 4 victory over the Arizona Cardinals.

On October 8, 2016, he was cut by the Rams. During his short stint with the Rams, Sensabaugh earned $4.5 million for playing in three games. The Rams decided to cut him after it became apparent that there was no longer a role for him in their secondary.

New York Giants
On October 11, 2016, Sensabaugh was signed by the New York Giants.

Sensabaugh joined a deep position group on the New York Giants and was initially sixth on the depth chart, behind Janoris Jenkins, Dominique Rodgers-Cromartie, Eli Apple, Trevin Wade, and Leon Hall. On October 16, 2016, he made his New York Giants debut and made one tackle during a 27–23 victory over the Baltimore Ravens.

The New York Giants finished with an 11-5 record and received a playoff berth. On January 8, 2017, Sensabaugh played in his first career playoff game and recorded six combined tackles, a pass deflection, and sacked Aaron Rodgers as the Giants were defeated by the Green Bay Packers 38–13 in the NFC Wildcard game.

Pittsburgh Steelers
On March 20, 2017, the Pittsburgh Steelers signed Sensabaugh to a two-year, $2.6 million contract with a $425,000 signing bonus. He reunited with his former head coach at Tennessee, Mike Munchak, who was the Pittsburgh Steelers' offensive line coach.

Sensabaugh was impressive throughout training camp and was named the fifth cornerback on the depth chart, behind Joe Haden, Artie Burns, Mike Hilton, and William Gay. He made his Steelers debut in their 21–18 season-opening victory over the Cleveland Browns. During a Week 3 overtime loss to the Chicago Bears, Sensabaugh recorded his first tackle as a member of the Steelers.

During a Week 11 matchup against Indianapolis Colts, Sensabaugh recorded three solo tackles after replacing Haden, who had left the Steelers' 20–17 victory with an apparent leg injury. It was later discovered that Haden had suffered a fractured fibula and would miss several games.

On November 16, 2017, Sensabaugh earned his first start as a member of the Steelers and made three combined tackles, deflected a pass, and intercepted a pass by Marcus Mariota, returning it for 32 yards. The Steelers went on to defeat Sensabaugh's former team, the Titans, 40–17 on Thursday Night Football. He finished the season playing in 14 games with four starts, recording 22 tackles, three passes defensed and one interception.

Denver Broncos
On October 8, 2019, Sensabaugh signed with the Denver Broncos. On November 13, 2019, Sensabaugh was waived by the Broncos.

Washington Redskins
The Washington Redskins signed Sensabaugh on December 17, 2019. He was released on March 23, 2020.

Personal life
Sensabaugh was born and raised in Kingsport, Tennessee by his parents, Becky and Kim Sensabaugh. He has two older brothers named Jamaar and Travis. In 2000, Jamaar, who was 16 at the time, was hospitalized after complaining about feeling lethargic. He was diagnosed with leukemia and died a few days later. His cousin, Gerald Sensabaugh, is a retired NFL safety, who played for the Jacksonville Jaguars and Dallas Cowboys from 2005 to 2012.

In July 2016, Sensabaugh married his longtime girlfriend Dominique, whom he had met at Clemson. They had their ceremony in Atlanta, Georgia and decided to forgo their honeymoon and instead go to Puerto Plata, Dominican Republic and hand out shoes to people in need. In lieu of a wedding gifts, the couple instead asked for donations. They worked with Soles4Souls a charity that works in getting shoes for the less fortunate.

Every summer, the couple also sponsors a youth football camp, headed by Coty, named the Sensabaugh Camp Classic. The camp is free of charge and is for youths from 6-17 and is held at J. Fred Johnson stadium in Sensabaugh's hometown of Kingsport. The camp has held its fifth season as of June 2017 and volunteers that attend include his cousin Gerald Sensabaugh and Free agent safety Marcus Gilchrist, who Sensabaugh was teammates with at Clemson.

References

External links

New York Giants bio
Los Angeles Rams bio
Tennessee Titans bio
Clemson Tigers bio

1988 births
Living people
People from Kingsport, Tennessee
Players of American football from Tennessee
American football cornerbacks
Clemson Tigers football players
Tennessee Titans players
Los Angeles Rams players
New York Giants players
Pittsburgh Steelers players
Denver Broncos players
Washington Redskins players